The 2022 Ontario general election was held on June 2, 2022, to elect Members of the Provincial Parliament to serve in the 43rd Parliament of Ontario.

The governing Progressive Conservatives, led by Premier Doug Ford, were re-elected to a second majority government, winning 7 more seats than they had won in 2018. The NDP retained their status as the Official Opposition, despite losing seats and finishing third in the popular vote, while the Ontario Liberals finished 2nd in the popular vote, but only won 8 seats, falling short of official party status. The Green Party retained the single seat they won in 2018 while the New Blue and Ontario Party failed to win a seat, both losing their lone sitting MPPs.

The election set a record for the lowest voter turnout in an Ontario provincial election, as only 43.53% of the people who were eligible voted. This broke the previous record for low turnout of 48.2% in the 2011 election.

Background

As of December 2016, Ontario elections are held on or before the first Thursday in June in the fourth calendar year following the previous general election.

In the June 2018 Ontario general election, the Progressive Conservative Party (PC Party) led by Doug Ford won a strong majority government. The New Democratic Party (NDP) led by Andrea Horwath became the Official Opposition; this was the first time since 1990 they surpassed their third-place status. The governing Liberal Party led by Premier Kathleen Wynne was decimated, winning only 7 out of the 124 seats in the legislature and being reduced to third-place status. The Green Party won its first seat in history, with leader Mike Schreiner becoming its first Member of Provincial Parliament (MPP).

Wynne resigned as leader immediately after and MPP John Fraser succeeded her as interim leader; he held that post until March 2020, when Wynne's former minister of transportation, Steven Del Duca, became permanent leader of the Liberal Party. Meanwhile, Horwath and Schreiner both remained leader of their parties and had no intention of resigning.

By December 2019, polling showed that the Ford government was as unpopular as the previous Wynne government as a result of not cutting spending enough as promised. However, the Progressive Conservatives experienced a surge of support during the early months of the COVID-19 pandemic; a Mainstreet Research poll in June 2020 showed the PCs at 42 percent, the Liberals at 28 percent, and the NDP at 23 percent.

On October 5, 2020, Ontario MPPs voted unanimously in favour of a motion stating that the government will not call an election prior to the fixed election date in 2022. Before this vote, the Legislative Assembly of Ontario could have been dissolved earlier by the Lieutenant Governor of Ontario on a motion of no confidence or if the Premier triggered a snap election (the former was extremely unlikely to work against the incumbent government with a majority).

In April 2021, the province experienced a major third wave of COVID-19 infections, and, after quickly reversing government health policies, such as opening and then abruptly closing restaurants, the government was criticized over their handling of COVID-19. This led to the PCs' support dipping, but remaining ahead of the Liberals and NDP.

In late April 2022 – days before the election call – the Ford government released its budget, promising to implement it if the government is reelected. The budget recorded a deficit of $19.9 billion and promised substantial spending on infrastructure (including for their proposed Highway 413) and tax breaks for some workers and seniors.

On May 3, 2022, Premier Doug Ford met with the Lieutenant Governor of Ontario to advise dissolution of the legislature and for writs of election be drawn up.

Timeline

2018
June 7: The Progressive Conservative Party of Ontario (PC) under Doug Ford wins a majority government in the 42nd Ontario general election, with Andrea Horwath's New Democrats (NDP) forming the Official Opposition. After leading the party to the worst result in its history, outgoing Premier Kathleen Wynne resigns as leader of the Ontario Liberal Party, but remains MPP for Don Valley West.
June 14: Ottawa South MPP John Fraser is named interim leader of the Ontario Liberal Party.
June 29: Progressive Conservative leader Doug Ford is sworn in as the 26th Premier of Ontario.
July 11: Wellington—Halton Hills MPP Ted Arnott, a Progressive Conservative, is elected Speaker by secret ballot.

2020
March 7: Former Vaughan MPP and cabinet minister Steven Del Duca is elected leader of the Ontario Liberal Party.
October 5: MPP's vote unanimously in favour of a motion introduced by Scarborough—Guildwood MPP Mitzie Hunter stating that the government will not call an election prior to the fixed election date in 2022.

2021
 November 8: Randy Hillier announces that he will run under the banner of the People's Party of Canada's proposed Ontario wing, the Ontario First Party. He later announced that he would not seek re-election.
December 14: Former Member of Parliament for Hastings—Lennox and Addington, Derek Sloan, announces that he will lead the Ontario Party in the upcoming election.

2022
 May 3: Writs of the election were drawn up, dissolving the Legislature and officially starting the campaign.
 May 10: First leaders' debate, organized by Federation of Northern Ontario Municipalities.
 May 16: Second leaders' debate, organized by Broadcast Consortium.
 June 2: Election day.

Campaign period

Candidates not standing for reelection
26 MPPs chose not to campaign in the election:

Party slogans

Debates

Issues

Summary
The 2022 Ontario Budget, entitled Ontario's Plan to Build, served as the platform of the governing PC Party. The main five themes it emphasized were: growing the clean energy economy with minerals from the Ring of Fire, building infrastructure including Highway 413, the Bradford Bypass and expanding GO service, supporting workers by funding more skilled trades programs, raising the minimum hourly wage to $15 and allowing universities to issue three-year degrees, lowering taxes by eliminating license plate stickers, eliminating tolls and reducing housing development fees and lastly to avoid future COVID-19 lockdowns by hiring more healthcare workers..

The Official Opposition NDP's campaign focused on increased funding for social programs and government services, which would be paid for through higher taxes on businesses and individuals earning over $200,000 per year. Funding would go toward reducing class sizes, raising welfare payments and disability payments, subsidies for black, indigenous and LGBTQ+ entrepreneurs, hiring more healthcare and education staff and increased wages for public servants. The NDP also proposed to expand COVID-19 vaccine mandates, implement a mixed member proportional electoral system, to close down all privately owned long-term care facilities and to stop the construction of new highway projects.

Endorsements

Opinion polls

Campaign polls

Pre-campaign polls

Notes

Results 

Despite only posting a marginal increase in the popular vote, the Progressive Conservative Party won with an increased parliamentary majority.

PC gains came primarily at the expense of the New Democratic Party, who lost significant vote share primarily to the Liberal Party. Nevertheless, the NDP maintained their role as official opposition by a large margin. Although she won her seat, Andrea Horwath resigned as leader of the NDP.

Despite edging out the NDP for second place in the popular vote, the Liberals only gained one seat and failed to regain official party status. After failing to win in his own riding, Liberal leader Steven Del Duca also announced his resignation as party leader.

The only two candidates outside the three largest parties to be elected were Green Party leader Mike Schreiner and independent candidate Bobbi Ann Brady, who prior to the election was the executive assistant to the retiring PC MPP in her riding.

As of 19:30 GMT on 3 June, the full unofficial results are as follows:

Synopsis of results

 = open seat
 = turnout is above provincial average
 = incumbent re-elected under the same party banner
 = incumbent switched allegiance after 2018 election
 = other incumbents renominated

Results summary by region

Detailed results

|-
! colspan=2 rowspan=2 | Political party
! rowspan=2 | Party leader
! colspan=5 | MPPs
! colspan=4 | Votes
|-
! Candidates
!2018
!Dissol.
!2022
!±
!#
!#±
!%
! ± (pp)

|style="text-align:left;"|Doug Ford
|124
|76
|67
|83
|7
|1,919,905
|406,618
|40.83%
|0.64

|style="text-align:left;"|Andrea Horwath
|124
|40
|38
|31
|9
|1,116,383
|813,583
|23.74%
|9.60

|style="text-align:left;"|Steven Del Duca
|121
|7
|7
|8
|1
|1,124,065
|281
|23.91%
|4.49

|style="text-align:left;"|Mike Schreiner
|124
|1
|1
|1
|1
|280,006
|15,487
|5.96%
|1.39

| colspan="2" style="text-align:left;"|Independents and no affiliation
|40
|–
|6
|1
|1
|25,332
|17,106
|0.54%
|0.40

|style="text-align:left;"|Jim Karahalios
|123
|
|1
|–
|–
|127,462
|
|2.71%
|

|style="text-align:left;"|Derek Sloan
|105
|–
|1
|–
|–
|83,618
|81,302
|1.78%
|1.74

|style="text-align:left;"|Greg Vezina
|28
|–
|–
|–
|–
|6,202
|9,944
|0.13%
|0.15

|style="text-align:left;"|Mark Snow
|16
|–
|–
|–
|–
|5,242
|37,580
|0.11%
|0.63

|style="text-align:left;"|Jim Torma
|13
|
|–
|–
|–
|2,638
|
|0.06%
|

|style="text-align:left;"|Paul McKeever
|11
|–
|–
|–
|–
|2,103
|462
|0.04%
|–

|style="text-align:left;"|Drew Garvie
|12
|–
|–
|–
|–
|2,100
|629
|0.04%
|0.01

|style="text-align:left;"|Brad Harness
|11
|–
|–
|–
|–
|1,651
|1,031
|0.04%
|0.01

|style="text-align:left;"|Yuri Duboisky
|17
|–
|–
|–
|–
|1,618
|581
|0.03%
|0.01

|style="text-align:left;"|Bahman Yazdanfar
|2
|–
|–
|–
|–
|568
|671
|0.01%
|0.01

|style="text-align:left;"|Murray Reid
|3
|–
|–
|–
|–
|414
|28
|0.01%
|–

|style="text-align:left;"|Troy Young
|3
|–
|–
|–
|–
|409
|219
|0.01%
|–

|style="text-align:left;"|Raymond Samuel
|3
|
|–
|–
|–
|367
|
|0.01%
|

|style="text-align:left;"|Lionel Poizner
|2
|–
|–
|–
|–
|290
|341
|0.01%
|–

|style="text-align:left;"|Queenie Yu
|3
|–
|–
|–
|–
|340
|738
|0.01%
|0.01

|style="text-align:left;"|Mansoor Qureshi
|2
|
|–
|–
|–
|295
|
|0.01%
|

|style="text-align:left;"|Trevor Holliday
|2
|–
|–
|–
|–
|283
|5,629
|0.01%
|0.09

|style="text-align:left;"|Kathleen Ann Sayer
|2
|
|–
|–
|–
|196
|
|–
|

|style="text-align:left;"|Peter House 
|2
|
|–
|–
|–
|182
|
|–
|

|style="text-align:left;"|Lilya Eklishaeva 
|2
|
|–
|–
|–
|182
|
|–
|

|style="text-align:left;"|Joshua E. Eriksen
|2
|–
|–
|–
|–
|108
|694
|–
|0.01

| style="text-align:left;" colspan="4"|Vacant
|3
| colspan="6"|
|-style="background:#E9E9E9;"
|colspan="3" style="text-align:left;"|Total
|897
!colspan="4" |124
|4,701,959
|1,042,901
!colspan="2" |100.00%
|-style="background:#E9E9E9;"
|colspan="8" style="text-align:left;"|Rejected, unmarked and declined ballots
|30,517
|30,909
|colspan="2" | 
|-style="background:#E9E9E9;"
|colspan="8" style="text-align:left;"|Turnout
|4,732,476
|1,073,810
|colspan="2" | 
|-style="background:#E9E9E9;"
|colspan="8" style="text-align:left;"|Registered voters / turnout %
!colspan="2" |10,740,426
|44.06%
|12.61
|}

Summary analysis

Most marginal 2-way and 3-way contests

Significant results among independent and minor party candidates
Those candidates not belonging to a major party, receiving more than 1,000 votes in the election, are listed below:

Seats changing hands
Of the 124 seats, 26 were open because of MPPs who chose not to stand for reelection, and voters in only 14 seats changed allegiance from the previous election in 2018.

There were 14 seats that changed allegiance in the election:

 NDP to PC (9)
 Brampton Centre
 Brampton East
 Brampton North
 Essex
 Hamilton East—Stoney Creek
 Thunder Bay—Atikokan
 Timmins
 Windsor—Tecumseh
 York South—Weston

 NDP to Liberal (2)
 Beaches—East York
 Kingston and the Islands

 Liberal to NDP (1)
 Thunder Bay—Superior North

 PC to NDP (1)
 Ottawa West—Nepean

 PC to Independent (1)
 Haldimand—Norfolk

Of the 14 seats that changed hands, seven were open seats where the MPPs chose to retire, and seven others saw their incumbents defeated.

Three PC MPPs had changed allegiance during the course of the past Legislature, but failed to secure reelection under their new banners. The seats reverted to the PCs.

References

Opinion poll sources

External links
Elections Ontario

June 2022 events in Canada
2022
Election
2022 elections in Canada